John Kurtz (born May 16, 1989) is a Canadian former professional ice hockey forward. He last played for the Belfast Giants in the Elite Ice Hockey League (EIHL).

Playing career
Prior to turning professional, Kurtz played four seasons of major junior hockey in the Ontario Hockey League with the Windsor Spitfires and Sudbury Wolves. For his play during the 2009–10 OHL season, Kurtz was unanimously selected to receive the Mickey Renaud Captain's Trophy as the “OHL team captain that best exemplifies leadership on and off the ice, with a passion and dedication to the game of hockey and his community”.

Immediately following the conclusion of his final OHL season, Kurtz began his professional career with the Syracuse Crunch, joining the AHL team for their closing games of the 2009–10 AHL season. Kurtz was later signed to a one-year entry level contract with NHL affiliate, the Anaheim Ducks on April 10, 2013.

After two seasons within the Ducks organization, Kurtz left as a free agent and later accepted an invitation to the Vancouver Canucks training camp on a professional try-out contract on September 11, 2015. On February 23, 2016, Kurtz signed a professional tryout contract with the Toronto Marlies of the AHL, where he played out the season with 4 points in 14 games.

Un-signed over the following summer, Kurtz belatedly signed a contract for the 2016–17 season, in agreeing to a return with the Norfolk Admirals, now of the ECHL on November 10, 2016. He appeared in 26 games with 14 points before he was signed to a professional try-out deal in a second stint with the Syracuse Crunch. On March 18, 2017, Kurtz was signed by the Crunch to a standard playing contract for the remainder of the campaign.

On 30 August 2017, Kurtz agreed to move to the Belfast Giants on a one-year deal.

Career statistics

Awards and honours

References

External links

1989 births
Belfast Giants players
Canadian ice hockey left wingers
Elmira Jackals (ECHL) players
Living people
Norfolk Admirals players
Norfolk Admirals (ECHL) players
Sudbury Wolves players
Syracuse Crunch players
Toronto Marlies players
Utica Comets players
Windsor Spitfires players
Canadian expatriate ice hockey players in Northern Ireland
Canadian expatriate ice hockey players in the United States